This is a list of Central Connecticut players in the NFL Draft.

Key

Selections

References

Lists of National Football League draftees by college football team

Central Connecticut Blue Devils NFL Draft